The Royal National Orthopaedic Hospital (RNOH) is a specialist orthopaedic hospital located in the London Borough of Harrow, United Kingdom, and a part of Royal National Orthopaedic Hospital NHS Trust. It provides the most comprehensive range of neuro-musculoskeletal health care in the UK, including acute spinal injury, complex bone tumour treatment, orthopaedic medicine and specialist rehabilitation for chronic back pain. The RNOH is a major teaching centre and around 20% of orthopaedic surgeons in the UK receive training there.

History 
The hospital was established by way of a merger of the Royal Orthopaedic Hospital (founded in 1840 and based in Hanover Square) and the National Orthopaedic Hospital (founded in 1836 and based in Great Portland Street) in August 1905. The City Orthopaedic Hospital (founded in 1851 and based in Hatton Garden) joined the merger in 1907.

New facilities for the merged entities were built on Great Portland Street and were opened by King Edward VII in July 1909. During the First World War, the hospital in Great Portland Street became an emergency hospital for the military and from early 1918 also accommodated discharged disabled soldiers. The Great Portland Street site continued to accommodate short-term in-patients after the war.

In 1922 the hospital management acquired the Mary Wardell Convalescent Home for Scarlet Fever in Stanmore and established its country branch there. The Duke of Gloucester laid the foundation stone for a major extension at the Stanmore site shortly thereafter. The Stanmore site started to accommodate long-term in-patients at this time. In April 1979, the Prince of Wales opened a Rehabilitation Assessment Unit at the Stanmore site, built with funds raised by the British Motor Racing Drivers Association in memory of Graham Hill who had once been a patient of the hospital. In March 1984 the Princess of Wales opened a spinal injuries unit at the Stanmore site. Later that year the lease on the building in Great Portland Street ended and services were transferred to the Stanmore site.

The Royal National Orthopaedic Hospital has had a central London out-patients clinic on Bolsover Street since 1909; the old facility closed in 2006 and a completely re-built facility opened on Bolsover Street in 2009.

In 2016 Norman Sharp, a 91-year-old British man, was recognised as having the world's oldest hip replacement implants. The two vitallium implants had been implanted at the Royal National Orthopaedic Hospital in November 1948. The 67-year-old implants had such an unusually long life, partly because they had not required the typical replacement of such implants, but also because of Mr Sharp's young age of 23 when they were implanted, owing to a childhood case of septic arthritis.

Services
As a national centre of excellence, the RNOH treats patients from across the country, many of whom have been referred by other hospital consultants for second opinions or for treatment of complex or rare conditions.

It broadcasts a hospital radio called Radio Brockley.

Performance
It was named by the Health Service Journal as one of the top hundred NHS trusts to work for in 2015.  At that time it had 1310 full-time equivalent staff and a sickness absence rate of 2.88%. 87% of staff recommend it as a place for treatment and 71% recommended it as a place to work.

It expects to lose £15.2m in income, 11% of its turnover during 2016–17 under changes to the NHS tariff, more than a 25% of what it received last year for inpatient work. In 2014 the Care Quality Commission recorded the Hospital as requiring improvement.

Notable staff
Sir Herbert Seddon (1903–1977), orthopaedic surgeon and author of Surgical Disorders of the Peripheral Nerves
 Audrey Smith (1915–1981), cryobiologist
 David Trevor (1905–1987), Orthopaedic Surgeon
 John Cholmeley (1902–1995), Orthopaedic Surgeon
 James Noel Chalmers Barclay (Ginger) Wilson (1919–2006), Orthopaedic Surgeon
 Rainer Campbell-Connolly (1919–2009), Neuro-Surgeon
 Mary Elizabeth Pinsent, Royal Red Cross (1868-1960), Assistant Matron / Acting Matron 1904-1906, Matron 1906-1933. She had leave of absence 1914-1919 and served as matron in the Territorial Force Nursing Service and  Queen Alexandra's  Imperial Military Nursing Service (Reserve). Pinsent trained at The London Hospital under Matron Eva Luckes.

See also
 List of hospitals in England
 List of NHS trusts

References

External links

 The Royal National Orthopaedic Hospital NHS Trust
 UCL Institute of Orthopedics and Musculoskeletal Science
 UCL School of Life & Medical Sciences
 University College London

NHS hospitals in London
Specialist hospitals in England
University College London